The 1980 Toronto Argonauts finished in fourth place in the Eastern Conference with a 6–10 record and failed to make the playoffs.

Offseason

Regular season

Standings

Schedule

Awards and honours

1980 CFL All-Stars
DT – Bruce Clark, CFL All-Star

1980 Eastern All-Stars
SB – Dave Newman, CFL Eastern All-Star
WR – Bob Gaddis, CFL Eastern All-Star
P – Zenon Andrusyshyn, CFL Eastern All-Star
DT – Bruce Clark, CFL Eastern All-Star
DE – Jim Corrigall, CFL Eastern All-Star
DB – Billy Hardee, CFL Eastern All-Star

References

Toronto Argonauts seasons
1980 Canadian Football League season by team